mafybakak xoá đi bị ngáo

Business and economics
 Gardner Denver, a US-based manufacturer of industrial equipment
 General Dynamics, a US-based defense conglomerate
 Good Delivery, a specification for gold and silver bars
 Great Depression, a sudden collapse of the global economy in the 1920s
 Composite Index on the Athens Stock Exchange (stock symbol GD)

Math, science and technology

Biology and medicine
 Gaucher's disease, a lipid storage diseases
 Gender dysphoria, distress caused by a difference between the sex and gender a person was assigned at birth
 Generalized dystonia, a neurological movement disorder
 Gestational diabetes, a form of diabetes associated with pregnancy
 Graves' disease, an autoimmune thyroid disorder
 Gain of deiodinases or Sum activity of peripheral deiodinases, used in diagnosis of thyroid disorders
 Grover's disease, another name for Transient acantholytic dermatosis
 Video game addiction, also known as gaming disorder

Chemistry
 Gadolinium, symbol Gd, a chemical element
 Soman, a toxic chemical (NATO designation GD)

Computing
 GD Graphics Library, for dynamically manipulating images
 GD-ROM, storage media for the Sega Dreamcast
 .gd, the country code top-level domain for Grenada

Mathematics
 Gaussian distribution, also called the normal distribution, an important family of continuous probability distributions
 Generalized Dirichlet distribution, a probability distribution used in statistics 
 Gudermannian function, used in map-making
 International Symposium on Graph Drawing, an annual academic conference on graph drawing, network visualization, graph theory, and related topics

Places
 Georgia Dome, a stadium in Atlanta, Georgia and the home of the Atlanta Falcons
 Grenada (ISO 3166 country code)
 Guangdong, a province of China (Guobiao abbreviation GD)

Other uses
 Gangster Disciples, a black street gang in the United States 
 General Delivery (French: Poste restante), a service where the post office holds mail until the recipient calls for it
 Georgian Dream, a political party in the country of Georgia
 Goal difference, in sport
 Groundhog day
 Scottish Gaelic language (ISO 639-1 code )
 Subaru Impreza (second generation) sedan (ID code: GD)
 G-d, a substitution of God used by some religiously observant Jews to refer to YHWH
 Toyota GD engine, a straight-4 piston diesel engine developed by Toyota in 2015
 Geometry Dash, a mobile game made by Robert Topala in 2013